These are the results of the 2020 Premier Badminton League league stage.

Results

Tie 1: Chennai Superstarz vs. Hyderabad Hunters

Tie 2: Northeastern Warriors vs. Bengaluru Raptors

Tie 3: Chennai Superstarz vs. Mumbai Rockets

Tie 4: Northeastern Warriors vs. Awadhe Warriors

Tie 5: Chennai Superstarz vs. Bengaluru Raptors

Tie 6: Pune 7 Aces vs. Mumbai Rockets

Tie 7: Awadhe Warriors vs. Hyderabad Hunters

Tie 8: Pune 7 Aces vs. Bengaluru Raptors

Tie 9: Awadhe Warriors vs. Mumbai Rockets

Tie 10: Hyderabad Hunters vs. Northeastern Warriors

Tie 11: Pune 7 Aces vs. Chennai Superstarz

Tie 12: Mumbai Rockets vs. Northeastern Warriors

Tie 13: Hyderabad Hunters vs. Bengaluru Raptors

Tie 14: Pune 7 Aces vs. Northeastern Warriors

Tie 15: Awadhe Warriors vs. Chennai Superstarz

Tie 16: Hyderabad Hunters vs. Mumbai Rockets

Tie 17: Awadhe Warriors vs. Pune 7 Aces

Tie 18: Northeastern Warriors vs. Chennai Superstarz

Tie 19: Bengaluru Raptors vs. Mumbai Rockets

Tie 20: Hyderabad Hunters vs. Pune 7 Aces

Tie 21: Bengaluru Raptors vs. Awadhe Warriors

References 

Premier Badminton League
Premier Badminton League
Badminton tournaments in India